Brandon Ubel (born August 29, 1991) is an American professional basketball player who last played for Boulazac Basket Dordogne.

Career
Ubel signed with Basic-Fit Brussels of the Belgian Ethias League in May 2013. For the 2014–15 season, Ubel signed with Port of Antwerp Giants.

References

External links
Belgian League profile

1991 births
Living people
American expatriate basketball people in Belgium
American men's basketball players
Antwerp Giants players
Basketball players from Kansas
Brussels Basketball players
Centers (basketball)
Nebraska Cornhuskers men's basketball players
Sportspeople from Overland Park, Kansas